In the Flesh Tour may refer to:

In the Flesh (Pink Floyd tour), 1977
In the Flesh (Roger Waters tour), 1999–2002
Utada: In the Flesh 2010

See also
In the Flesh (disambiguation)